The Velodrome at the Shree Shiv Chhatrapati Sports Complex is an outdoor velodrome in Pune, Maharashtra, India. While the velodrome was a prime venue for the 1994 National Games of India it has never been a place for any major events thereafter, and was left unused. As there were no cycling events at the 2008 Commonwealth Youth Games held at the Shree Shiv Chhatrapati Sports Complex, the velodrome was not used as a competition venue during these Games.

In 2014 it was announced that with a Rs 10 crore  maintenance grant from the governments for the entire Shree Shiv Chhatrapati Sports Complex, the facelift of the velodrome had top priority. At that time the velodrome was in dilapidated state.

See also
 List of velodromes

References

Buildings and structures in Pune
Velodromes in India
Sports venues in Pune
Sports venues completed in 1993
1993 establishments in Maharashtra
20th-century architecture in India